The 2021–22 North Texas Mean Green men's basketball team represented the University of North Texas during the 2021–22 NCAA Division I men's basketball season. The team was led by fifth-year head coach Grant McCasland, and played their home games at UNT Coliseum in Denton, Texas as a member of the West division of Conference USA. They finished the season 25-7, 16-2 in C-USA Play to finish as regular season champions. They defeated Rice in the quarterfinals of the C-USA tournament before losing in the semifinals to Louisiana Tech.  As a No. 1 seed who didn’t win their conference tournament, they received an automatic bid to the National Invitation Tournament where they defeated Texas State in the first round before losing in the second round to Virginia.

Previous season 
In a season limited due to the ongoing COVID-19 pandemic, the Mean Green finished the 2020–21 season 18–10, 9–5 to finish in third place in the division. They defeated Middle Tennessee, Old Dominion, Louisiana Tech, and Western Kentucky to win the C-USA tournament championship. As a result, the received the conference's automatic bid to the NCAA tournament as the No. 13 seed in the South region. There they upset No. 4-seeded Purdue in the first round before losing to No. 5-seeded Villanova in the second round.

Offseason

Departures

Incoming Transfers

Recruiting class of 2021

Roster

Schedule and results

|-
!colspan=12 style=| Exhibition

|-
!colspan=12 style=| Non-conference regular season

|-
!colspan=12 style=| Conference USA regular season

|-
!colspan=12 style=| Conference USA tournament

|-
!colspan=12 style=| NIT tournament

Source

See also
 2021–22 North Texas Mean Green women's basketball team

References

North Texas Mean Green men's basketball seasons
North Texas Mean Green
North Texas men's basketball
North Texas men's basketball
North Texas